The Tritirachiomycetes are class of fungi in the Pucciniomycotina. The class contains a single order, the Tritirachiales, which in turn contains the single family Tritirachiaceae.  Currently, two genera, Tritirachium and Paratritirachium, are recognized in this lineage.

References

Monotypic fungus taxa
Basidiomycota classes
Pucciniomycotina